Brussels is a community within the Municipality of Huron East in Huron County, Ontario, Canada. It held village status prior to 2001. The most recent population estimate was 993 residents in 2021.

History 

Brussels was settled in 1854, when William Ainley purchased 200 acres of land alongside the Maitland River. Originally, Ainley named the settlement after himself, and it was known as Ainleyville until it was incorporated as Brussels in 1872.

The Ronald Streamer, a piece of firefight equipment, was made in Brussels.

Under the government of former Premier Mike Harris, it was amalgamated into the Municipality of Huron East on January 1, 2001.

Geography 
Brussels is located in the Municipality of Huron East; however, the town lies on the municipal border to the Municipality of Morris-Turnberry. Both of these municipalities are located in Huron County, Ontario.

The town is split by two Huron County roads; 12 and 16. Huron County Road 12, called Turnberry Street (in-town) and Brussels Line (out-of-town) runs north-south through the town while Huron County Road 16 runs west-east through the town with a distinct name depending on the direction. The road is named Morris Road (out-of-town) or Orchard Line (in-town) when traveling west from the town; the road is named Newry Road (out-of-town) or Queen Street (in-town) when travelling east from the town.

The Maitland River runs through the town in a south to north direction which has resulted in the construction of a dam in the in community. The river and low-land areas of the dam typically floods every spring from increased rainfall and snow melt.

As Brussels is a rural community, farmland surrounds the town on all sides with scattered bushes amongst the fields.

Climate
Brussels consists of humid continental climate with four distinct seasons. The climate generally falls into the Dfb climate subtype.

Demographics 

Media

Newspapers 
The Brussels Post was a newspaper organization formed in 1884 in the town of Brussels. The newspaper organization was operation from 1884 through to 1929 before ceasing operations. The operations started back up in 1937 through to 1983 when The Brussels Post was discontinued. Four years after The Brussels Post ceased operations, the North Huron Citizen formed.

In the early days of The Brussels Post, the operations were weekly.

While sources claim that The Brussels Post was formed in 1885, the earliest known digitalized paper from January 2, 1885 states that it's the 26th paper or 26th week, indicating that the first paper would have been issued around July 4, 1884.

After the discontinuing of The Brussels Post in 1981, The Citizen, provided by North Huron Citizen was formed. The Citizen is the newspaper still distributed around the community as of 2022. Similar to The Brussels Post, the newspaper is issued weekly.

While the head-office for the North Huron Citizen is located in the nearby community of Blyth, Ontario, there was a small office located in the Brussels downtown core. The sub-office was closed in 2022.

Notable people 
 Allan Blair, professor, experimentalist
 Darwin McCutcheon, professional ice hockey player
 Elston Cardiff, politician
 Frances Beatrice Taylor, poet, journalist
 Harry Dean Ainlay, former mayor of Edmonton, Alberta
 Jack McIntyre, professional ice hockey player
 Janet Cardiff, artist

See also

 Municipality of Huron East
 List of unincorporated communities in Ontario

References

The Settlement Of Huron County by James Scott.

Communities in Huron County, Ontario
Former villages in Ontario
Populated places disestablished in 2001